Diarsia jucunda, the smaller pinkish dart, is a moth of the family Noctuidae. It is found from Newfoundland and central Ontario, west to northern Michigan and Wisconsin, south to Ohio. In the Appalachians it is found as far south as North Carolina. It has been recently recorded from Tennessee.

The wingspan is about 33 mm. Adults are on wing from June to August. There is one generation per year.

The larvae are probably general feeders and have been recorded from grasses and Taraxacum officinale.

External links
Bug Guide
Images
Moths of Maryland
The Noctuinae (Lepidoptera: Noctuidae) of Great Smoky Mountains National Park, U.S.A.

Diarsia
Moths of North America
Moths described in 1857